Thomas L. Delworth is an atmospheric and oceanic climate scientist and 
Senior Scientist at the Geophysical Fluid Dynamics Laboratory (GFDL), part of NOAA.
He also serves on the faculty of Oceanic Science at Princeton University.

Delworth is a fellow of the American Geophysical Union and received its 2021 Bert Bolin Award for Climate research, for "major contributions in atmosphere ocean interactions through pioneering climate modeling that has advanced the understanding of climate variations, change, and extremes." He has been recognized as a Highly Cited Researcher by Clarivate Analytics for 2021 and multiple previous years for having “demonstrated significant influence through publication of multiple highly cited papers during the last decade".

Early life and education
Delworth grew up in St. Louis, Missouri.  He received his  B.S. in Integrated Science in 1979 from Northwestern University. He earned his MS in Meteorology (1983) and his  Ph.D.  in Atmospheric Science (1994) from the University of Wisconsin.

Career
In 1984, Delworth joined the Climate Dynamics Group of the  Geophysical Fluid Dynamics Laboratory (GFDL), part of the Office of Oceanic & Atmospheric Research  of the National Oceanic & Atmospheric Administration (NOAA) of the  U.S. Department of Commerce, in  Princeton, NJ.  He has served as a Research Meteorologist (1984-2001), a Group Leader (2001-2012) and Supervisory Physical Scientist (2012-). 
In addition Delworth has been a lecturer in atmospheric and oceanic sciences at Princeton University since 2008.

Delworth has collaborated with many others including 2021 Nobel Laureate Syukuro Manabe, who created the first climate models to show the effects of carbon dioxide building up in the atmosphere, Ronald J. Stouffer, Michael E. Mann, and Rong Zhang. Delworth serves on the Syukuro Manabe Climate Research Award Committee of the American Meteorological Society.

Research
Delworth studies the global climate system through long-term global climate modeling at timescales ranging from seasons to decades and centuries with an emphasis  on understanding climate variability, change and predictability.
He has helped to develop climate modelling systems including CM2.1 
and SPEAR. He has used hierarchies of models to examine climate variability and related changes. He compares the natural variability of the climate (changes that would occur without human influence) with responses to atmospheric changes in greenhouse gases and aerosols that result from human actions.

Delworth's research focuses on the impact of oceans throughout the global climate system, affecting both oceans and continents worldwide.  
Delworth has done key research into the operation of the Atlantic Meridional Overturning Circulation (AMOC) and the related Atlantic Multidecadal Variability (AMV) and North Atlantic Oscillation (NAO). He is credited with "major contributions in atmosphere ocean interactions through pioneering climate modeling that has advanced the understanding of climate variations, change, and extremes." 
He has collaborated widely on studies of the role of the ocean in extreme weather such as warming temperatures, drought, tropical cyclones, flooding and winter storms.

Awards and honors
 2021, Bert Bolin Award for Climate Research, American Geophysical Union
 2021, Highly Cited Researcher, Clarivate Analytics (as well as multiple previous years)
 2018, Fellow, American Geophysical Union
 2015, Fellow, American Meteorological Society
 2015, Department of Commerce Gold Medal, joint award, “For outstanding research, leading to improved capability to predict seasonal‐to‐decadal variations in regional hydrological conditions and extremes”.
 2008, NOAA Administrator's Award, joint award,  “for outstanding dedication to developing U.S. CCSP Synthesis and Assessment Products integrating climate research for decision support.”
 2005, Department of Commerce Silver Medal, joint award, “For delivering state-of-the-art model simulations of past, present, and future climate and for enabling open access to the data sets. Results from a recent international workshop support the conclusion that the Geophysical Fluid Dynamics Laboratory climate model is among the best in the world”.

Selected publications

References

American meteorologists
Living people
Fellows of the American Geophysical Union
Fellows of the American Meteorological Society
Year of birth missing (living people)
American climatologists